Ralph Edward "Primo" Miller (September 18, 1915 – February 19, 1999) was an American football tackle who played two seasons with the Cleveland Rams of the National Football League. He played college football at Rice University and attended Brackenridge High School in San Antonio, Texas.

References

External links
Just Sports Stats

1915 births
1999 deaths
Players of American football from San Antonio
American football tackles
Rice Owls football players
Cleveland Rams players
Brackenridge High School alumni